Anthene georgiadisi is a butterfly in the family Lycaenidae. It is found in Liberia.

References

Butterflies described in 2009
Anthene
Endemic fauna of Liberia
Insects of West Africa
Butterflies of Africa